Menno Willems (born 10 March 1977) is a Dutch former professional footballer who played as a defender between 1996 and 2006.

He notably played for Vitesse, Ajax and Grimsby Town. He also played for FC Den Bosch, HFC Haarlem, Sparta Rotterdam and Go Ahead Eagles before being forced to retirement at the age of 30.

Career
Born in Amsterdam, Willems was scouted by Dutch club Ajax and he signed to the Amsterdam-based club when he was a youngster and took the step up to the first team in 1996. After one season of limited chances or football action, Willems left Ajax bound for fellow Eredivisie side Vitesse Arnhem where he would remain until 1999.

He then spent a season playing with FC Den Bosch before returning to Vitesse a year later. In November 2001, Menno signed a three-month loan deal with English club Grimsby Town as Mariners boss Lennie Lawrence brought in a wave of foreign talent following the dismissal of Alan Buckley. Willems along with David Nielsen, Knut Anders Fostervold and Zhang Enhua linked up with the club on loan.

After the end of his three-month loan deal Grimsby paid Vitesse £160,000 for Menno, and made him one of the most highly paid players at the club. He played out the final few months of the 2000–01 season and was the only foreign loan star too sign a permanent deal. In the new season, slight injury problems coupled with performances of other players saw Willems fall out of favour at the club under new manager Paul Groves. In May 2002, Willems left the club on a free transfer.

He soon returned to the Netherlands, playing for HFC Haarlem for two seasons, before playing out the next two seasons with Sparta Rotterdam and Go Ahead Eagles.

Willems called time on his professional football career at the end of the 2005–06 season. Because of wear and tear to the cartilage in his knee, he was advised to end his football career.

Personal life
Willems is related to fellow footballer and former Derby County midfielder Ron Willems.

In 2012 Willems was sent to prison in Belgium for fraud following the collapse of his flowers business.

References

External links

1977 births
Living people
Dutch footballers
Association football defenders
Association football midfielders
Netherlands youth international footballers
Netherlands under-21 international footballers
Eredivisie players
Eerste Divisie players
English Football League players
AFC Ajax players
SBV Vitesse players
FC Den Bosch players
Grimsby Town F.C. players
HFC Haarlem players
Sparta Rotterdam players
Go Ahead Eagles players
Footballers from Amsterdam
Dutch expatriate footballers
Dutch expatriate sportspeople in England
Expatriate footballers in England